The 2011 Copa del Rey Final was the 109th final since the tournament's establishment (including two seasons where two rival editions were played). The match was a traditional 'El Clásico' rivalry between Barcelona and Real Madrid which took place on 20 April 2011 at the Mestalla Stadium in Valencia, making it the sixth such Copa del Rey final (the most recent in April 1990 at the same venue), just four days after the two teams played each other in La Liga and seven days before they met in the UEFA Champions League semi-final first leg.

Real Madrid lifted the trophy for the 18th time in their history with a 1–0 victory after extra time. It was Real Madrid's first win in 18 years, having last won the Copa del Rey in 1993 against Real Zaragoza

Road to the final

Match
The match was scoreless after 90 minutes but there had been numerous scoring chances on both sides. Cristiano Ronaldo was credited with having three good chances in the first half, the last of which was kept out with a one-handed save by Barcelona goalkeeper José Manuel Pinto. Barcelona did not have a shot on target in the first half, but in the second they dominated possession, with Andrés Iniesta and Pedro both forcing saves from Real Madrid goalkeeper Iker Casillas. The game was won in the first period of extra time by the game's only goal, a header from Cristiano Ronaldo from a cross from Ángel Di María.

The BBC gave credit to Real Madrid manager José Mourinho's defensive tactics for keeping Barcelona scoreless. When Barcelona's Xavi, Andrés Iniesta, Lionel Messi and David Villa got the ball, they were challenged by two Madrid players. There were many fouls in the match, with the referee issuing eight yellow cards. Real Madrid's Ángel Di María was sent off in the 120th minute after receiving his second booking.

Match details

Aftermath
Real Madrid players celebrated their victory that evening by riding a double-decker bus through Madrid where they were greeted by cheering crowds. While holding the trophy aloft, Real Madrid defender Sergio Ramos dropped the cup in front of the bus, where it was crushed. Ramos later joked that he had not dropped the cup, but that the cup jumped down to meet the fans. The cup was replaced immediately with a spare version and placed in the Real Madrid museum.

See also
El Clásico

References

External links
El Real Madrid vuelve a reinar  Marca.com, 21 April 2011 
Final Copa del Rey | Barcelona 0 - Real Madrid 1  AS.com, 21 April 2011
Real Madrid 1 Barcelona 0; aet: match report The Telegraph, 20 April 2011

2011
1
FC Barcelona matches
Real Madrid CF matches
21st century in Valencia
El Clásico matches